Village Bonded Societies are the largest classification of acephalous societies.  They differ from lineage-bonded societies and land-bonded societies mainly in that they are large enough to support both secret societies and age sets.

With both of those institutions in place, a village-bonded society can make the transition to statehood, if the need arises.

Anthropological categories of peoples